Foggie may refer to:

Foggie, Aberdeenshire, Scottish village, (Aberchirder)
Rickey Foggie (born 1966), American and Canadian footballer, football coach
David Foggie (1878–1948), Scots painter

See also
Foggy (disambiguation)